Andrew Michael Sullivan (born 10 August 1963) is a British-American author, editor, and blogger. Sullivan is a political commentator, a former editor of The New Republic, and the author or editor of six books. He started a political blog, The Daily Dish, in 2000, and eventually moved his blog to platforms, including Time, The Atlantic, The Daily Beast, and finally an independent subscription-based format. He announced his retirement from blogging in 2015. From 2016 to 2020, Sullivan was a writer-at-large at New York. His newsletter The Weekly Dish was launched in July 2020.

Sullivan has stated that his conservatism is rooted in his Catholic background and in the ideas of the British political philosopher Michael Oakeshott. In 2003, he wrote he was no longer able to support the American conservative movement, as he was disaffected with the Republican Party's continued rightward shift towards social conservatism on social issues during the George W. Bush era.

Born and raised in Britain, he has lived in the United States since 1984 and currently resides in Washington, D.C., and Provincetown, Massachusetts. He is openly gay and a practicing  Catholic.

Early life and education
Sullivan was born in South Godstone, Surrey, England, into a  Catholic family of Irish descent, and was brought up in the nearby town of East Grinstead, West Sussex. He was educated at a Catholic primary school followed by Reigate Grammar School, where his classmates included future Labour Party leader Keir Starmer and future Conservative member of the House of Lords Andrew Cooper. He won a scholarship in 1981 to Magdalen College, Oxford, where he was awarded a first-class Bachelor of Arts in modern history and modern languages. He founded the Pooh Stick Society at Oxford, and in his second year, he was elected President of the Oxford Union for Trinity term 1983.

After writing briefly for a newspaper, Sullivan won scholarship in 1984 to Harvard University, where he earned a Master of Public Administration in 1986 from the John F. Kennedy School of Government, followed by a Doctor of Philosophy degree in government from Harvard in 1990. His dissertation was titled Intimations Pursued: The Voice of Practice in the Conversation of Michael Oakeshott.

Career
Sullivan first wrote for The Daily Telegraph on American politics. In 1986, Sullivan went to work for The New Republic magazine initially on a summer internship; among the most significant articles he wrote were "Gay Life Gay Death", an essay on the Aids crisis, and the "Sleeping with the Enemy" column in which he attacked the practice of "outing", both of which earned him some recognition among the gay community. He was appointed the editor of The New Republic in October 1991, a position he held until 1996. In that position, he expanded the magazine from its traditional roots in political coverage to cultural issues and the politics surrounding them. During this time, the magazine generated several high-profile controversies.

While completing graduate work at Harvard in 1988, Sullivan published an attack in Spy magazine on Rhodes Scholars, "All Rhodes Lead Nowhere in Particular," which dismissed recipients of the scholarship as "hustling apple-polisher[s]"; "high-profile losers"; "the very best of the second-rate"; and "misfits by the very virtue of their bland, eugenic perfection." "[T]he sad truth is that as a rule," Sullivan wrote, "Rhodies possess none of the charms of the aristocracy and all of the debilities: fecklessness, excessive concern that peasants be aware of their achievement, and a certain hemophilia of character." Author Thomas Schaeper notes that "[i]ronically, Sullivan had first gone to the United States on a Harkness Fellowship, one of many scholarships spawned in emulation of the Rhodes program."

In 1994, Sullivan published excerpts on race and intelligence from Richard Herrnstein and Charles Murray's controversial The Bell Curve, which argued that some of the measured difference in IQ scores among racially defined groups was a result of genetic inheritance. Almost the entire editorial staff of the magazine threatened to resign if material that they considered racist was published. To appease them, Sullivan included lengthy rebuttals from 19 writers and contributors. He has continued to speak approvingly of the research and arguments presented in The Bell Curve, writing, "The book ... still holds up as one of the most insightful and careful of the last decade. The fact of human inequality and the subtle and complex differences between various manifestations of being human—gay, straight, male, female, black, Asian—is a subject worth exploring, period." According to Sullivan, this incident was a turning point in his relationship with the magazine's staff and management, which he conceded was already bad because he "was a lousy manager of people". He left the magazine in 1996.

Sullivan began writing for The New York Times Magazine in 1998, but was fired by editor Adam Moss in 2002. Jack Shafer wrote in Slate magazine that he had asked Moss in an e-mail to explain this decision, but that his e-mails went unanswered, adding that Sullivan was not fully forthcoming on the subject. Sullivan wrote on his blog that the decision had been made by Times executive editor Howell Raines, who found Sullivan's presence "uncomfortable", but defended Raines's right to fire him. Sullivan suggested that Raines had done so in response to Sullivan's criticism of the Times on his blog, and said he had expected that his criticisms would eventually anger Raines.

Sullivan has also worked as a columnist for The Sunday Times of London.

Ross Douthat and Tyler Cowen have suggested that Sullivan is the most influential political writer of his generation, particularly because of his very early and strident support for same-sex marriage, his early political blog, his support of the Iraq War, and his subsequent support of Barack Obama's presidential candidacy.

After the cessation of his long-running blog, The Dish, in 2015, Sullivan wrote regularly for New York during the 2016 presidential election, and in February 2017 he began writing a weekly column, "Interesting Times", for the magazine.	

On July 19, 2020, following the unexplained absence of his column for June 5, Sullivan announced that he would no longer write for New York. He announced he would be reviving The Dish as a newsletter, The Weekly Dish, hosted by Substack.

Politics

Sullivan describes himself as a conservative and is the author of The Conservative Soul. He has supported a number of traditional libertarian positions, favouring limited government and opposing social interventionist measures such as affirmative action. However, on a number of controversial public issues, including same-sex marriage, social security, progressive taxation, anti-discrimination laws, the Affordable Care Act, the United States government's use of torture, and capital punishment, he has taken positions not typically shared by conservatives in the United States. In July 2012, Sullivan said that "the catastrophe of the Bush-Cheney years ... all but exploded the logic of neoconservatism and its domestic partner-in-crime, supply-side economics."

One of the most important intellectual and political influences on Sullivan is Michael Oakeshott. Sullivan describes Oakeshott's thought as "an anti-ideology, a nonprogramme, a way of looking at the world whose most perfect expression might be called inactivism." He argues "that Oakeshott requires us to systematically discard programmes and ideologies and view each new situation sui generis. Change should only ever be incremental and evolutionary. Oakeshott viewed society as resembling language: it is learned gradually and without us really realising it, and it evolves unconsciously, and for ever." In 1984, he wrote that Oakeshott offered "a conservatism which ends by affirming a radical liberalism." This "anti-ideology" is perhaps the source of accusations that Sullivan "flip-flops" or changes his opinions to suit the whims of the moment. He has written, "A true conservative—who is, above all, an anti-ideologue—will often be attacked for alleged inconsistency, for changing positions, for promising change but not a radical break with the past, for pursuing two objectives—like liberty and authority, or change and continuity—that seem to all ideologues as completely contradictory."

As a youth, Sullivan was a fervent supporter of Margaret Thatcher and later Ronald Reagan. He says of that time, "What really made me a right-winger was seeing the left use the state to impose egalitarianism—on my school", after the Labour government in Britain tried to merge his admissions-selective school with the local comprehensive school. At Oxford, he became friends with future prominent conservatives William Hague and Niall Ferguson and became involved with Conservative Party politics.

From 1980 through 2000, he supported Republican presidential candidates in the United States, with the exception of the election of 1992, when he supported Bill Clinton in his first presidential campaign. In 2004, however, he was angered by George W. Bush's support of the Federal Marriage Amendment designed to enshrine in the Constitution marriage as a union between a man and a woman, as well as what he saw as the Bush administration's incompetence over its Iraq War management, and consequently supported the presidential campaign of John Kerry, a Democrat.

Sullivan endorsed Senator Barack Obama for the Democratic nomination in the 2008 United States presidential election, and Representative Ron Paul for the Republican nomination. After John McCain clinched the Republican primary and named Sarah Palin as his vice presidential nominee, Sullivan began to espouse a birther-like conspiracy theory involving Palin and her young son Trig Palin. Sullivan devoted a significant amount of space on The Atlantic, questioning whether Palin is Trig's biological mother. He and others who held this belief, dubbed "Trig Truthers", demanded Palin to produce a birth certificate or other piece of medical evidence that proves Trig is indeed her biological son.

Sullivan eventually endorsed Obama for president, largely because he believed that he would restore "the rule of law and Constitutional balance"; he also argued that Obama represented a more realistic prospect for "bringing America back to fiscal reason", and expressed a hope that Obama would be able to "get us past the culture war." Sullivan continued to maintain that Obama was the best choice for president from a conservative point of view. During the 2012 election campaign, he wrote, "Against a radical right, reckless, populist insurgency, Obama is the conservative option, dealing with emergent problems with pragmatic calm and modest innovation. He seeks as a good Oakeshottian would to reform the country's policies in order to regain the country's past virtues. What could possibly be more conservative than that?"
Sullivan has declared support for Arnold Schwarzenegger and other like-minded Republicans. He argues that the Republican Party, and much of the conservative movement in the United States, has largely abandoned its earlier scepticism and moderation in favour of a more fundamentalist certainty, both in religious and political terms. He has said this is the primary source of his alienation from the modern Republican Party.

In January 2009, Forbes magazine ranked Sullivan No. 19 on a list of "The 25 Most Influential Liberals in the U.S. Media". Sullivan rejected the "liberal" label and set out his grounds in a published article in response.

In August 2018, after Sarah Jeong, an editorial board-member of The New York Times, received widespread criticism for her old anti-white tweets, Sullivan accused Jeong of being racist and calling white people "subhuman". Sullivan also accused Jeong of spreading eliminationist rhetoric; a belief that political opponents are a societal cancer that should be separated, censored or exterminated.

LGBT issues

HIV 
In 1996, discussing HIV, he argued in the New York Times Magazine that "this plague is over" insofar as "it no longer signifies death. It merely signifies illness." This led to "a trend of white male journalists proclaiming that AIDS is over", according to Sarah Schulman.

Gay issues 
Sullivan, like Marshall Kirk, Hunter Madsen, and Bruce Bawer, has been described by Urvashi Vaid as a proponent of "legitimation", seeing the objective of the gay rights movement as being "mainstreaming gay and lesbian people" rather than "radical social change". Sullivan wrote the first major article in the United States advocating for gay people to be given the right to marry, published in The New Republic in 1989. According to one columnist for Intelligent Life, many on "the gay left," aiming to alter social codes of sexuality for everyone, were chagrined at Sullivan's endorsement of the "assimilation" of gay people into "straight culture." In the wake of the United States Supreme Court rulings on same-sex marriage in 2013 (Hollingsworth v. Perry and United States v. Windsor), The New York Times op-ed columnist Ross Douthat suggested that Sullivan might be the most influential political writer of his generation, writing: "No intellectual that I can think of, writing on a fraught and controversial topic, has seen their once-crankish, outlandish-seeming idea become the conventional wisdom so quickly, and be instantiated so rapidly in law and custom."

As of 2007, Sullivan opposed hate crime laws, arguing that they undermine freedom of speech and equal protection.

In 2014, Sullivan opposed calls to remove Brendan Eich as CEO of Mozilla for donating to the campaign for Proposition 8, which made same-sex marriage illegal in California. In 2015, he claimed that "gay equality" had been achieved in the United States through the persuasive arguments of "old-fashioned liberalism" rather than by the activism of "identity politics leftism."

Transgender issues 
In 2007, he said he was "no big supporter" of the Employment Non-Discrimination Act, arguing that it would "not make much of a difference." However, he said, the "gay rights establishment" was making a tactical error to insist on including protections for gender identity, as he believed it would be easier to pass the bill without transgender people.

In a September 2019 Intelligencer column, Sullivan expressed concern that gender-nonconforming children (especially those who are likely one day to come out as gay) might be encouraged to believe that they are transgender when they are not. In November 2019, Sullivan wrote another Intelligencer column on young women who, in their teens, had begun to transition to live as men but who later detransitioned. In that article, he discussed the controversy over a 2018 journal article by Lisa Littman that proposed a socially mediated subtype of gender dysphoria that Littman had termed "rapid onset gender dysphoria". In April 2021, he said it should be illegal for doctors to initiate cross-sex hormones for kids under 16 or sex reassignment surgery for kids under 18.

Recognitions 
In 1996, Sullivan's book, Virtually Normal: An Argument about Homosexuality, won the 1996 Mencken Award for Best Book, presented by the Free Press Association. In 2006, Sullivan was named an LGBT History Month icon.

Foreign policy 
Sullivan supported the 2003 invasion of Iraq by the United States and was initially hawkish in the war on terror, arguing that weakness would embolden terrorists. He was "one of the most militant" supporters of the Bush administration's counter-terrorism strategy immediately following the September 11 attacks in 2001; in an essay for The Sunday Times, he stated, "The middle part of the country—the great red zone that voted for Bush—is clearly ready for war. The decadent Left in its enclaves on the coasts is not dead—and may well mount what amounts to a fifth column." Eric Alterman wrote in 2002 that Sullivan had "set himself up as a one-man House Un-American Activities Committee" running an "inquisition" to unmask "anti-war Democrats", "basing his argument less on the words these politicians speak than on the thoughts he knows them to be holding in secret".

Later, Sullivan criticised the Bush administration for its prosecution of the war, especially regarding the numbers of troops, protection of munitions, and treatment of prisoners, including the use of torture against detainees in United States custody. Though he argued that enemy combatants in the war on terror should not have been given status as prisoners of war because "terrorists are not soldiers", he believed that the US government was required to abide by the rules of war—in particular, Article 3 of the Geneva Conventions—when dealing with such detainees. In retrospect, Sullivan said that the torture and abuse of prisoners at the Abu Ghraib prison in Iraq had jolted him back to "sanity". Of his early support for the invasion of Iraq, he said, "I was terribly wrong. In the shock and trauma of 9/11, I forgot the principles of scepticism and doubt towards utopian schemes that I had learned."

On the edition of 27 October 2006 of Real Time with Bill Maher, he described conservatives and Republicans who refused to admit they had been wrong to support the Iraq War as "cowards". On 26 February 2008, he wrote on his blog: "After 9/11, I was clearly blinded by fear of al Qaeda and deluded by the overwhelming military superiority of the US and the ease of democratic transitions in Eastern Europe into thinking we could simply fight our way to victory against Islamist terror. I wasn't alone. But I was surely wrong." His reversal on the Iraq issue and his increasing attacks on the Bush administration caused a severe backlash from many hawkish conservatives, who accused him of not being a "real" conservative.

Sullivan authored an opinion piece, "Dear President Bush," that was featured as the cover article of the October 2009 edition of The Atlantic magazine. In it, he called on former President Bush to take personal responsibility for the incidents and practices of torture that occurred during his administration as part of the war on terror.

Sullivan states that he has "always been a Zionist". However, his views have become more critical over time. In February 2009, he wrote that he could no longer take the neoconservative position on Israel seriously.

In January 2010, Sullivan blogged that he was "moving toward" the idea of "a direct American military imposition" of a two-state solution to the Israeli-Palestinian conflict, with NATO troops enforcing "the borders of the new states of Palestine and Israel". He commented, "I too am sick of the Israelis. [...] I'm sick of having a great power like the US being dictated to." His post was criticised by Noah Pollak of Commentary, who referred to it as "crazy", "heady stuff" based on "hubris".

In February 2010, Leon Wieseltier suggested in The New Republic that Sullivan, a former friend and colleague, had a "venomous hostility toward Israel and Jews" and was "either a bigot, or just moronically insensitive" toward the Jewish people. Sullivan rejected the accusation and was defended by some writers, while others at least partly supported Wieseltier.

In March 2019, Sullivan wrote in New York magazine that while he strongly supported the right of a Jewish state to exist, he felt that United States Representative Ilhan Omar's comments about the influence of the pro-Israel lobby were largely correct. Sullivan said that "it is simply a fact that the Israel lobby uses money, passion, and persuasion to warp this country's foreign policy in favor of another country — out of all proportion to what Israel can do for the US."

Sullivan devoted a significant amount of blog space to covering the allegations of fraud and related protests after the 2009 Iranian presidential election. Francis Wilkinson of The Week stated that Sullivan's "coverage—and that journalism term takes on new meaning here—of the uprising in Iran was nothing short of extraordinary. 'Revolutionary' might be a better word."

Sullivan was inspired by the Iranian people's reactions to the election results and used his blog as a hub of information. Because of the media blackout in Iran, Iranian Twitter accounts were a major source of information. Sullivan frequently quoted and linked to Nico Pitney of The Huffington Post.

Immigration 
Writing for New York magazine, Sullivan expressed concern that high levels of immigration to the United States could drive "white anxiety" by causing white Americans to be "increasingly troubled by the pace of change" since they were never formally asked whether they wanted such a demographic shift. Sullivan has advocated for tighter immigration controls on asylum and overall lower levels of immigration. He has criticized Democrats for what he perceived as their unwillingness to implement such controls.

Race 
As editor at The New Republic, Sullivan published excerpts from the 1994 book The Bell Curve, by Richard Herrnstein and Charles Murray. The book, which was about the subject of IQ on society and public policy, had a controversial chapter which looked at the issue of race and IQ, and said that some racial groups had lower IQs than others.

In 2015 Jeet Heer, in an article in The New Republic entitled "The New Republic's Legacy on Race" described Sullivan's decision as an example of "The magazine's myopia on racial issues". The importance of Sullivan to the popularization of The Bell Curve and race science was noted by Matthew Yglesias who called Sullivan "the punditocracy's original champion of Murray's thinking on genetics". In Current Affairs in 2017 Nathan J. Robinson said that Sullivan:

...helped midwife The Bell Curve and grant flimsy race science a veneer of intellectual respectability. He still believes race is a reasonable prism through which to view the world, and that if only our racial stereotypes are "true," they are acceptable. He is therefore an unreliable and ideologically-biased guide to political and social science.

Religion
Sullivan identifies himself as a faithful Catholic while disagreeing with some aspects of the Catholic Church's doctrine.

He expressed concern about the election of Pope Benedict XVI in a Time magazine article on 24 April 2005, titled "The Vicar of Orthodoxy". He wrote that Benedict was opposed to the modern world and women's rights, and considered gays and lesbians innately disposed to evil. Sullivan has, however, agreed with Benedict's assertion that reason is an integral element of faith.

Sullivan takes a moderate approach to religion, rejecting fundamentalism and describing himself as a "dogged defender of pluralism and secularism". He defended religious moderates in a series of exchanges with atheist author Sam Harris.

Blogging
In late 2000, Sullivan began his blog, The Daily Dish. The core principle of the blog has been the style of conservatism he views as traditional. This includes fiscal conservatism, limited government, and classic libertarianism on social issues. Sullivan opposes government involvement with respect to sexual and consensual matters between adults, such as the use of marijuana and prostitution. He believes recognition of same-sex marriage is a civil-rights issue but expressed willingness to promote it on a state-by-state legislative federalism basis, rather than trying to judicially impose the change. Most of Sullivan's disputes with other conservatives have been over social issues and the handling of postwar Iraq.

Sullivan gave out yearly "awards" for various public statements, parodying those of the people the awards were named after. Throughout the year, nominees were mentioned in various blog posts. The readers of his blog chose winners at the end of each year.
 The Hugh Hewitt Award, introduced in June 2008 and named after a man Sullivan described as an "absurd partisan fanatic", was for the most egregious attempts to label Barack Obama as un-American, alien, treasonous, and far out of the mainstream of American life and politics.
 The John Derbyshire Award was for egregious and outlandish comments on gays, women, and minorities.
 The Paul Begala Award was for extreme liberal hyperbole.
 The Michelle Malkin Award was for shrill, hyperbolic, divisive, and intemperate right-wing rhetoric. (Ann Coulter was ineligible for this award so that, in Sullivan's words, "other people will have a chance.")
 The Michael Moore Award was for divisive, bitter, and intemperate left-wing rhetoric.
 The Matthew Yglesias Award was for writers, politicians, columnists, or pundits who criticised their own side of the political spectrum, made enemies among political allies, and generally risked something for the sake of saying what they believed.
 The "Poseur Alert" was awarded for passages of prose that stood out for pretension, vanity, and bad writing designed to look profound.
 The Dick Morris Award (formerly the Von Hoffman Award) was for stunningly wrong cultural, political, and social predictions. Sullivan renamed this award in September 2012, saying that Von Hoffman was "someone who in many ways got the future right—at least righter than I did."

In February 2007, Sullivan moved his blog from Time to The Atlantic Monthly, where he had accepted an editorial post. His presence was estimated to have contributed as much as 30% of the subsequent traffic increase for The Atlantic's website.

In 2009, The Daily Dish won the 2008 Weblog Award for Best Blog.

Sullivan left The Atlantic to begin blogging at The Daily Beast in April 2011. In 2013, he announced that he was leaving The Daily Beast to launch The Dish as a stand-alone website, charging subscribers $20 a year.

In a note posted on The Dish on 28 January 2015, Sullivan announced his decision to retire from blogging. He posted his final blog entry on 6 February 2015. On 26 June 2015, he posted an additional piece in reaction to Obergefell v. Hodges, which legalized same-sex marriage in the United States.

In July 2020, Sullivan announced that The Dish would be revived as a weekly feature, including a column and podcast; he published there and elsewhere a notable obituary of Queen Elizabeth II.

Personal life
In 2001, it came to light that Sullivan had posted anonymous online advertisements for unprotected anal sex, preferably with "other HIV-positive men". He was widely criticised in the media for this, with some critics noting that he had condemned President Bill Clinton's "incautious behavior", though others wrote in his defence. 

In 2003, Sullivan wrote a Salon article identifying himself as a member of the gay "bear community". On 27 August 2007, he married Aaron Tone in Provincetown, Massachusetts.

Sullivan was a friend of late journalist Christopher Hitchens.

Sullivan was barred for many years from applying for United States citizenship because of his HIV-positive status. Following the statutory and administrative repeals of the HIV immigration ban in 2008 and 2009, respectively, he announced his intention to begin the process of becoming a permanent resident and citizen. On The Chris Matthews Show on 16 April 2011, Sullivan confirmed that he had become a permanent resident, showing his green card. On 1 December 2016, Sullivan became a naturalised US citizen.

He has been a daily user of marijuana since 2001.

Works
As author
 Virtually Normal: An Argument About Homosexuality (1995). Knopf. .
 Love Undetectable: Notes on Friendship, Sex and Survival (1998). Knopf. .
 The Conservative Soul: How We Lost It, How to Get It Back (2006). HarperCollins. .
 Intimations Pursued: The Voice of Practice in the Conversation of Michael Oakeshott (2007). Imprint Academic. 
 Out on a Limb: Selected Writing, 1989–2021 (2021). Avid Reader Press. 
As editor
 Same-Sex Marriage Pro & Con: A Reader (1997). Vintage. . First edition
 Same-Sex Marriage Pro & Con: A Reader (2004). Vintage. . Second edition
 The View from Your Window: The World as Seen by Readers of One Blog (2009). Blurb.com

References

External links

 The Weekly Dish, Andrew Sullivan's substack newsletter
 The Dish, Andrew Sullivan's blog
 Column archive (2009–2009) at The Atlantic
 Why I Blog, November 2008
 
 
 
 
 World's Best Blogger?, Harvard Magazine, May–June 2011

1963 births
Living people
Alumni of Magdalen College, Oxford
The Atlantic (magazine) people
British Christian Zionists
British expatriates in the United States
English bloggers
English columnists
English magazine editors
English political writers
English people of Irish descent
English Roman Catholics
People with HIV/AIDS
Harvard Kennedy School alumni
LGBT conservatism in the United States
British LGBT journalists
American LGBT journalists
LGBT people from Massachusetts
LGBT Roman Catholics
English LGBT rights activists
English gay writers
The New Republic people
People educated at Reigate Grammar School
People from Godstone
Presidents of the Oxford Union
The Sunday Times people
Writers from Washington, D.C.
Naturalized citizens of the United States
British male bloggers
American male bloggers
American bloggers
21st-century LGBT people
Harkness Fellows
Proponents of scientific racism